Tumi Holdings, Inc., is a manufacturer of high-end suitcases and bags for travel based in Edison, New Jersey. Founded in 1975 by Charlie Clifford after a stint in the Peace Corps in Peru, the company is named after a Peruvian tumi ceremonial knife used for sacrifices. Tumi, Inc. was a unit of Doughty Hanson & Co. from 2004 until after its 2012 initial public offering.

Tumi's products are known for their black-on-black ballistic nylon. Tumi is available at department stores and specialty stores, as well as over 120 Tumi stores and 200 shops around the world.

Tumi also supplies accessories such as belts, pens, and electronic equipment. The company teamed with designer Anish Kapoor in 2006 to produce the PowerPack Backpack that incorporated solar technology for charging phones and PDAs. The company also had a licensing agreement with the Italian motorcycle manufacturer Ducati to launch a collection of eight co-branded pieces in 2006, sold through both of the brands' retail outlets.

Tumi puts a metal plate with a unique 20-digit registration number in each of its bags. Customers can register for the Tumi Tracer program to have their contact information entered into a central database so they can be reunited with their bag if it is found.

In 2004, Doughty Hanson & Co, a London-based private equity firm, took over Tumi for $276M.  The takeover came with a price drop in their products and a change in warranty from their famed lifetime warranty to 5 years.  However, beyond the 5 years, the brand does still offer its customers a lifetime service and repair warranty, with possible assessed fees and costs.

Jerome Griffith became the CEO of Tumi, Inc. in 2009.

On April 19, 2012, Tumi made an initial public offering of 18,779,865 shares, as Tumi Holdings, Inc. (NYSE: TUMI). In December 2013, Joseph R. Gromek was named Chairman of Board of Directors.

On March 4, 2016, Samsonite announced it would acquire Tumi in an all-cash transaction worth US$1.8Bn.

In November 2019, McLaren announced a partnership agreement with Tumi as the official luggage partner for McLaren Racing and McLaren Automotive.

Website

References

 Tumi company website at Tumi.com

Companies based in Middlesex County, New Jersey
Manufacturing companies based in New Jersey
Companies formerly listed on the New York Stock Exchange
Manufacturing companies established in 1975
Luggage brands
Samsonite
South Plainfield, New Jersey
2012 initial public offerings
2016 mergers and acquisitions
American subsidiaries of foreign companies
2004 mergers and acquisitions
High fashion brands